Gavin Thorpe is a game designer who has worked primarily on board games. He has also authored a number of novels and short stories for the Black Library.

Career
Gav Thorpe has been designing and developing products for Games Workshop since 1994. His credits include the Inquisitor skirmish game, as well as work on several editions of Warhammer and Warhammer 40,000, and supplements for both game systems. He also designed the board game Gobbo's Banquet, and has written more than half a dozen novels for the Black Library. He also wrote the script for the Mark of Chaos computer game.

Thorpe lives in Nottingham, England.

Bibliography

Legacy of Caliban trilogy
  Ravenwing  (January 2013)
  Master of Sanctity  (June 2014)

Last Chancers
Thirteenth Legion (December 2000)
Kill Team (October 2001)
Annihilation Squad (March 2004)
Deliverance (short story)
Liberty (short story)

Path of the Eldar
Path of the Warrior (July 2010)
Path of the Seer (September 2011)
Path of the Outcast (September 2012))

Short stories
Aenarion Published in Issue 12 of Hammer and Bolter October 2011
The Divine Word Published in Black Library Weekender Anthology November 2012

Novels
Space Hulk: The Novel (July 2010)

Reception
In reviewing the Warhammer novel The Blades of Chaos (2003), critic Don D'Ammassa wrote that it is "better written than most similar novels", although it has "little to offer readers who aren't fond of this subgenre." D'Ammassa also reviewed The Heart of Chaos (2004), stating that "Thorpe always does a competent job and this one has a rousing finish."

References

Board game designers
English male novelists
Games Workshop
Living people
Year of birth missing (living people)